The Front Range is a mountain range of the Southern Rocky Mountains of North America located in the central portion of the U.S. State of Colorado, and southeastern portion of the U.S. State of Wyoming. It is the first mountain range encountered as one goes westbound along the 40th parallel north across the Great Plains of North America.

The Front Range runs north-south between Casper, Wyoming, and Pueblo, Colorado, and rises nearly 10,000 feet above the Great Plains. Longs Peak, Mount Evans, and Pikes Peak are its most prominent peaks, visible from the Interstate 25 corridor. The area is a popular destination for mountain biking, hiking, climbing, and camping during the warmer months and for skiing and snowboarding during winter. Millions of years ago, the present-day Front Range was home to ancient mountain ranges, deserts, beaches, and even oceans.

The name "Front Range" is also applied to the Front Range Urban Corridor, the populated region of Colorado and Wyoming just east of the mountain range and extending from Cheyenne, Wyoming south to Pueblo, Colorado.  This urban corridor benefits from the weather-moderating effect of the Front Range mountains, which help block prevailing storms.

Geology

Pikes Peak Granite
About 1 billion years ago, a mass of magma rose to the surface through a much older mantle, cooling to form what is now known as the Precambrian Pikes Peak Granite. Over the next 500 million years, the granite eroded with no sedimentation forming over this first uplift, resulting in a local expression of the Great Unconformity. At about 500–300 million years ago, the region began to sink and sediments began to deposit in the newly formed accommodation space. Eroded granite produced sand particles that began to form strata, layers of sediment, in the sinking basin. Sedimentation would continue to take place until about 300 million years ago.

Fountain formation
Around 300 million years ago, the sinking suddenly reversed, and the sediment-covered granite began to uplift, giving rise to the Ancestral Rocky Mountains. Over the next 150 million years, during the uplift the mountains continued to erode and cover their flanks in their own sediment. Wind, gravity, rainwater, snow, and ice-melt supplied rivers that ultimately carved through the granite mountains and eventually led to their complete removal. The sediment from these mountains lies in the very red Fountain Formation today. Red Rocks Amphitheatre outside of Denver, Colorado, is set within the Fountain Formation.

Lyons Sandstone
At 280 million years ago, sea levels were low and present-day Colorado was part of the super-continent Pangaea. Sand deserts covered most of the area, spreading as dunes seen in the rock record, known today as the Lyons Sandstone. These dunes appear to be cross-bedded and show various fossil footprints and leaf imprints in many of the strata making up the section. Uplifted beds of Lyons Sandstone are found along the Front range and form the gateway to the Garden of the Gods.

Lykins Formation
30 million years later, the sediment deposition was still taking place with the introduction of the Lykins Shale. This formation can be best attributed to its wavy layers of muddy limestone and signs of stromatolites that thrived in a tidal flat in present-day Colorado. 250 million years ago, the Ancestral Rockies were eroding away while the shoreline was present during the break-up of Pangaea. This formation began right after Earth's largest extinction 251 million years ago at the Permian–Triassic Boundary. Ninety percent of the planet's marine life became extinct and a great deal on land as well.

Morrison Formation
After 100 million years of deposition, a new environment brought rise to a new formation, the sandstone Morrison Formation. The Morrison Formation contains some of the best fossils of the Late Jurassic. It is especially known for its sauropod tracks and sauropod bones, among other dinosaur fossils. As identified by the fossil record, the environment was filled with various types of vegetation such as ferns and Zamites. While this time period boasts many types of plants, grass had not yet evolved.

Dakota Sandstone
The Dakota Sandstone, which was deposited around 100 million years ago at the opening of the Cretaceous Western Interior Seaway from the Artic to the Tropics, shows evidence of ferns and dinosaur tracks. Sheets of ripple marks can be seen on some of the strata, confirming advancing and retreating near-shore environments. These Dakota Group sandstone beds are resistant to erosion and have uplifted to form the Dakota Hogback, a ridge between the mountains and the plains.

Benton Group / Niobrara Formation
Over the next 35 million years, the Cretaceous seaway repeated widened as far as Utah and Wisconsin and narrowed to near closure. With no mountains present at the time, the Colorado area was in the line of the deepest channel of the seaway; but being on the Transcontinental Arch, the Front Range areas was relatively shallow and was near the last land to submerge as the seaway opened. Shale and chalk were deposited over the area as Greenhorn of the Benton Group and the Niobrara Formation. Within these beds are found abundant marine fossils (ammonites and skeletons of fish and such marine reptiles as mosasaurs, plesiosaurs, and extinct species of sea turtles) along with rare dinosaur and bird remains. Today, the Fort Hays Limestone member forms flatirons or secondary hogbacks on the east slope of the Dakota Hogback.

Pierre Shale
The non-chalky shales of the Pierre Formation formed in the final cycle of the seaway. At about 68 million years ago, the Front Range began to rise again due to the Laramide Orogeny in the western half of the state, draining from being at the bottom of a sea to land again, giving yield to another fossiliferous rock layer, the Denver Formation.

Denver Formation

The Denver Formation contains fossils of dinosaurs like Tyrannosaurus rex and Triceratops. While the forests of vegetation, dinosaurs, and other organisms thrived, their reign would come to an end at the Cretaceous–Paleogene boundary (which was formerly known as the K-T boundary). In an instant, millions of species were obliterated by a meteor impact in Mexico's Yucatán Peninsula. While this extinction led to the demise of the dinosaurs and other organisms, some life did prevail to repopulate the earth as it recovered from this tremendous disaster. The uplifted mountains continued to constantly erode and, by 40 million years ago, the region was once again buried in material eroded from the central mountains.

Castle Rock Conglomerate
Suddenly, 37 million years ago, a great volcanic eruption took place in the Collegiate Range and covered the landscape in hot ash that instantly torched and consumed everything across the landscape. An entire lush environment was capped in a matter of minutes with 20 feet of extremely resistant rock, rhyolite. However, as seen before, life rebounds, and after a few million years mass floods cut through the rhyolite and eroded much of it as plants and animals began to recolonize the landscape. The mass flooding and erosion of the volcanic rock formed the Castle Rock Conglomerate that can be found in the Front Range.

Quaternary deposits
Eventually, at about 10 million years ago, the Front Range began to rise up again and the resistant granite in the heart of the mountains thrust upwards and stood tall, while the weaker sediments deposited above it eroded away. As the Front Range rose, streams and recent (16,000 years ago) glaciations during the Quaternary age literally unburied the range by cutting through the weaker sediment and giving rise to the granitic peaks present today. This was the last step in forming the present-day geologic sequence and history of today's Front Range.

Prominent peaks
The Front Range includes the highest peaks along the eastern edge of the Rockies. The highest mountain peak in the Front Range is Grays Peak.  Other notable mountains include Torreys Peak, Mount Evans, Longs Peak, Pikes Peak, and Mount Bierstadt.

Travel 
The main interstate highways that run through the Front Range are Interstate 70, which crosses west of Denver, Colorado, and Interstate 80, which crosses near Laramie, Wyoming. U.S. Route 34 travels through the mountains near Loveland, Colorado, although this route is typically closed from October to May. U.S. Route 24 travels through the southern Front Range west of Colorado Springs, eventually connecting with I-70 west of Vail, Colorado.

Along with the roads that run through the Front Range, the Union Pacific Railroad operates two rail lines through the mountains. The first Overland Route, transiting southern Wyoming, runs parallel to I-80 for much of its way. The second is the former Denver & Rio Grande Western Railroad Moffat Route, which runs parallel to the Colorado River and through the 6.5-mile-long Moffat Tunnel. Originally the Denver and Salt Lake Railway, the former Rio Grande is used for freight by both Union Pacific and BNSF, and it is also used by Amtrak's California Zephyr and Winter Park Express.

See also

 Eldorado Canyon State Park
 Flatirons
 Front Range Urban Corridor
 Garden of the Gods
 Mountain ranges of Colorado
 Palmer Divide
 Red Rocks Park
 Roxborough State Park

References

Further reading
 Fishman, N.S. et al. (2005). Principal areas of oil, natural gas, and coal production in the northern part of the Front Range, Colorado. Geologic Investigations Series I-2750-B. Reston, Virginia: U.S. Department of the Interior, U.S. Geological Survey.
 Sprague, L.A., R.E. Zuellig, and J.A. Dupree. (2006).  Effects of urban development on stream ecosystems along the Front Range of the Rocky Mountains, Colorado and Wyoming. USGS Fact Sheet 2006-3083. Reston, Virginia: U.S. Department of the Interior, U.S. Geological Survey.

External links

 

Mountain ranges of Colorado
Ranges of the Rocky Mountains